El Llano is a municipality in the Mexican state of Aguascalientes.

As of 2010, the municipality had a total population of 18,828, up from 17,115 in 2005.

The municipality had 244 localities, the largest of which (with 2010 populations in parentheses) were: the municipal seat of Palo Alto (5,399), classified as urban, and Los Conos (1,108), Ojo de Agua de Crucitas (1,078), and Santa Rosa (El Huizache) (1,050), classified as rural.

Demographics

References

External links
http://www.aguascalientes.gob.mx/estado/m_elll.html

Municipalities of Aguascalientes